Stock Car is an overhead-view racing video game written by A. W. Halse and published in the UK by Micro Power. It was released in 1984 for the BBC Micro, Acorn Electron, and Commodore 64 computers.
Although the cassette inlay gives the release date as 1984, some sources state the release date as 1983, and the game is also known as Stock Car Racer.

Stock Car is similar to Atari, Inc.'s Sprint 2 arcade game (1976) and Indy 500 for the Atari VCS (1977).

Gameplay

The game provides a top-down view of one of six user-selectable racing tracks. One or two human players in red cars compete against yellow computer-controlled cars. Oil slicks can be added which cause the cars to veer off-course, making the game more challenging. The amount of skidding can also be selected by the player. A race consists of anything between 1 and 40 laps.

Players can steer their car left and right, but unlike most racing games, there are no keys for directly braking or accelerating. Instead, the player drives by selecting one of four gears (or neutral) and the car will accelerate according to the currently selected gear.

Reception
Tom Bowker describes the game as "primitive", but he "loved it deeply".

The game was reviewed in the August 1984 edition of Acorn User (Issue 25)

and later briefly mentioned in issue 4.03 of Electron User as part of the ten-game Micro Power Magic compilation, where it was described as "very realistic".

Legacy
Another game, Grand Prix by S. Merrigan on the Triple Deckers volume 1 compilation was described by Dave Reeder as "a very poor copy of Stock Car".

References

External links
 Stock Car at Gamebase 64
 Video of the game on the Acorn Electron
 Video of the game on the BBC Micro

1984 video games
BBC Micro and Acorn Electron games
Commodore 64 games
Micro Power games
Multiplayer and single-player video games
Top-down racing video games
Video games developed in the United Kingdom